Emily Cox (born 23 February 1985) is a British-Irish actress, born in Vienna, Austria, currently based in Berlin and Vienna. She played the lead female role of Brida, in the British television series The Last Kingdom (2015-2022).

Biography 
Cox was born to a British father and an Irish mother in Vienna. Her parents later divorced. Both of them are pianists, who originally came to Vienna on a grant for musicians. Cox grew up in Vienna and graduated from high school (Matura) in 2003. She developed an interest in acting after performing in a play as part of her English classes during her final year in high school. After her graduation she went on to study acting at the Max Reinhardt Seminar. In 2008 she was under contract as a stage actor at the Theater in der Josefstadt in Vienna. In 2011 Cox moved to Berlin and since then she has appeared in various movies and series on German and Austrian TV, among them several Tatort movies. From 2015 to 2022 she played the role of the Viking and Anglo-Saxon woman Brida in the TV series The Last Kingdom, which made her known to international audiences.

Cox also appeared in a few movies for the big screen including The Fatherless (2011), The Silent Mountain and Head Full of Honey (2018).

Filmography

References

External links

1985 births
Living people
21st-century Austrian actresses
Austrian people of British descent
Austrian people of Irish descent
Actresses from Vienna